Iguana is a genus of herbivorous lizards.

Iguana may also refer to:

Biology 
in America, any member of Iguanidae, the iguana family
 especially the Green iguana or common iguana, the species popular as pets
in Africa, a large member of Varanus
especially Varanus niloticus, the Nile monitor
 Iguana meat

Music 
 The Iguanas (Michigan band), one of Iggy Pop's bands
 The Iguanas (Louisiana band), a rock band from New Orleans, Louisiana
 "Iguana", a single by Mauro Picotto, 1999
 "Iguana", a single by Inna, 2018

Computing 
 IGUANA Computing, the computing usage group
 IguanaTex, a free open source LaTeX formula editor add-in for Powerpoint
 Iguana Entertainment, a defunct US video game developer.

Other uses 
 RG-34 (Iguana FV4), a South African armoured car
 Iguana Girl (or Daughter of the Iguana or Iguana Daughter), a manga by Moto Hagio
 Iguana (film), a 1988 film directed by Monte Hellman
San Antonio Iguanas, a minor league professional ice hockey team based in San Antonio, Texas

See also
Iguanodon
Guana (disambiguation)
Guano
Goanna
 The Night of the Iguana, a short story and play by Tennessee Williams, which has been filmed